Ozren Nedoklan (2 October 1922 – 2 September 2004) was a Yugoslav football player and manager. He played as a centre forward and later as a centre-half.

References

External links
 
 
 

1922 births
2004 deaths
Footballers from Split, Croatia
Association football forwards
Association football central defenders
Yugoslav footballers
RNK Split players
HNK Hajduk Split players
AC Bellinzona players
Yugoslav expatriate footballers
Expatriate footballers in Switzerland
Yugoslav expatriate sportspeople in Switzerland
Yugoslav football managers
AC Bellinzona managers
NK Istra 1961 managers
HNK Hajduk Split managers
RNK Split managers
Club Athlétique Bizertin managers
Yugoslav expatriate football managers
Expatriate football managers in Switzerland
Expatriate football managers in Tunisia
Yugoslav expatriate sportspeople in Tunisia